Willerich (*unknown – 4 May? 838*) was the second bishop of Bremen in Germany; or, according to some, the first, his predecessor Willehad being just a missionary in the area, and the diocese set up after his death. He was consecrated in 804 or 805.

He took part in an evangelizing mission to Denmark in 823, with Ebbo of Rheims and Halitgar, bishop of Cambrai. It had only a very limited success, the conversion of the north would take place later with Ansgar.

References
Francis J. Tschan (reprinted 2002), History of the Archbishops of Hamburg-Bremen by Adam of Bremen

Notes

|-

838 deaths
Bishops of Bremen
Year of birth unknown
9th-century Saxon bishops